Clarence Richard Walter (26 March 1837 – 11 Dec 1918) was an English cricketer. Walter's batting style is unknown. He was born at Brentford, Middlesex. Walter made a single first-class appearance for Surrey against a combined Kent and Sussex team in 1859 at the Royal Brunswick Ground, Hove. In a match which Surrey won by four wickets, Walter batted once in Surrey's first-innings and was dismissed for a duck by Edgar Willsher. This was his only major appearance for Surrender. He died in Cardiff, Glamorgan, Wales on 11 December 1918.

References

External links

1838 births
1918 deaths
Sportspeople from Guildford
English cricketers
Surrey cricketers